Chigang Station is a station on Line 8 of the Guangzhou Metro. It started operations on 28June 2003. It is located to the northeast of the junction of Xingang Middle Road and Jiangnan Avenue in the Haizhu District.

Before the extension to both lines 2 and 8 opened in September 2010, this station ran as part of Line 2 as a single line from Wanshengwei to Sanyuanli.

References

Railway stations in China opened in 2003
Guangzhou Metro stations in Haizhu District